The Society of Psychologists in Management (SPIM) is a professional association of psychologists who also serve in managerial or leadership positions.

History and purpose
The Society of Psychologists in Management was founded in 1985 in Tampa, Florida by a small group of psychologists who also served in managerial roles. These included Anthony Broskowski, Richard Kilburg, Dwight Harshbarger, Margaret Hastings, and Harry Levinson. The intent was to provide a professional home and identity for psychologists who were no longer working as practicing or academic psychologists, both to help them retain their identity and to recognize psychology-management as a distinctive profession.

Presidents of SPIM
The presidents of SPIM have been: 
 Richard Kilburg (1985–1986)
 Anthony Broskowski (1986–1987)
 D. Dwight Harshbarger (1987–1988)
 Elizabeth Wales (1989–1990)
 Darwin Dorr (also known as Deke Dorr; 1990–1991)
 Dory Hollander (1991–1992)
 Ken Ball (1992–1993)
 Robert Perloff (1993–1994)
 Rodney L. Lowman (1994–1995)
 Marc T. Frankel (1995–1996)
 Ann Howard (1996–1997)
 Mark Ginsberg (1997–1998)
 Arthur M. Freedman (1998–1999)
 Paul Lloyd (1999–2000)
 Robert P. Lowman (2000–2001)
 Donald O. Clifton (2001–2002)
 Carl Greenberg (2002–2003)
 Marilyn Gowing (2003–2004)
 Linda Richardson (2004–2005)
 Dale Thompson (2005–2006)
 Judith Albino (2006–2007)
 John C. Bruckman (2007–2008)
 Cathleen Civiello (2008–2009)
 Roger Cooper (2010–2011)

Conferences, awards, and journal
SPIM holds an annual mid-winter conference for psychologist-managers and also provides programming at the annual meeting of the American Psychological Association. The Society annually awards the Distinguished Psychologist in Management (DPIM) Award and the Richard Kilburg Service Award. It also publishes an academic journal, The Psychologist-Manager Journal. The journal has provided professional guidance relevance for psychologist-managers (e.g., crisis management, Ball, 2005; principles for growing a company, Clifton, 1999; transformational leadership, Eisenhower) and special issues such as on The Psychologist-President (Lowman, 1999). The organization also formed a not-for-profit foundation to further its charitable purposes.

Memberships 
The association is dedicated to maintaining their membership criteria. SPIM's members are psychologists usually holding a managerial or consultant positions, are teaching or conducting research in management or leadership. SPIM also offers Affiliate memberships to those who hold a master's degree in psychology and are employed as a manager or consultant to management.

Further reading
Ball, K. (2001). Managing in ongoing crises: A psychologist-manager case study. The Psychologist-Manager Journal 5 (2), 15-20.
Clifton, D.O. (1999). Principles for growing a company. The Psychologist-Manager Journal 3 (1), 49-58.
Eisenhower, D. (2000). A leadership moment in history: The Allied crisis of December 1944. In D.O. Clifton (Ed.) Positive psychology and its implications for the psychologist-manager (Special Issue),The Psychologist-Manager Journal 4, 169-182.
Lowman, R.L. (1999). The psychologist-president (Special Issue). The Psychologist-Manager Journal 4, 25-113.

References

External links
 

Psychology organizations based in the United States
Medical and health professional associations in Chicago
Psychology-related professional associations
Business and finance professional associations